Elihu Spencer (February 12, 1721 – December 27, 1784) was an American clergyman who  served as a chaplain during the French and Indian War.  During the American Revolution, he was invited to North Carolina by that colony's provincial congress to convince loyalist congregations to join  the patriot cause.

Spencer was born in East Haddam, Connecticut and graduated from Yale in 1746. He prepared to become a missionary to the Six Nations Iroquois under 
David Brainerd and Jonathan Edwards.  In 1748, he accompanied Edwards to an Indian conference in Albany, New York, and on September 14 of that year, was ordained.

He served as a missionary on the New York frontier, and in 1750 he was appointed pastor of the Presbyterian Church in Elizabeth, New Jersey.  In 1756, he was appointed pastor of another Presbyterian Church in what is now Jamaica, Queens. Two years later, New York Governor James De Lancey appointed him chaplain of the colonies troops who were preparing for service in the French and Indian War.

After the war, Spencer served as pastor in Shrewsbury, Middletown Point, Shark River, and Amboy, New Jersey. In 1764 the synod of New York and Philadelphia send Spencer, along with Reverend Alexander McWhorter on a mission to organize the irregular North Carolina congregations.

References
 Thomas Spencer, his son
 Spencer Fullerton Baird, his great-grandson
Halsey, The Old New York Frontier, Pt. 2, Ch. 2, Missionaries from New England (1745–1748)

External links
 

1721 births
1784 deaths
American military chaplains
American Christian clergy
American Presbyterian missionaries
Presbyterian missionaries in the United States
American Revolution chaplains